Divshal Poshteh (also Romanized as Dīvshal Poshteh) is a village in Divshal Rural District, in the Central District of Langarud County, Gilan Province, Iran. At the 2006 census, its population was 186, in 44 families.

References 

Populated places in Langarud County